Super Kabuki II: One Piece is a Japanese kabuki play based on the popular manga One Piece about the character Captain Monkey D. Luffy who is on a quest to become pirate king together with his crew. The play premiered in 2015 and was very successful.

Production

Cast

 Ennosuke Ichikawa – Monkey D. Luffy, Shanks, Boa Hancock
 Ukon Ichikawa – Whitebeard
 Minosuke Bando – Roronoa Zoro, Bon Clay, Squardo
 Hayato Nakamura – Vinsmoke Sanji, Inazuma
 Shun'en Ichikawa – Nami, Boa Sandersonia
 Seiji Fukushi – Portgas D. Ace
 Noritoshi Kashima – Brook, Sakazuki "Akainu"
 Kazuyuki Asano – Silvers Rayleigh, Emporio Ivankov, Sengoku
 Kôtarô Ichikawa – Hatchan, Sentomaru
 Juen Ichikawa – Avalo Pizarro
 Emisaburô Ichikawa – Elder Nyon
 En'ya Ichikawa – Jimbei, Blackbeard
 Emiya Ichikawa – Nico Robin, Marigold
 Omezô Ichikawa – Magellan
 Monnosuke Ichikawa – Tsuru

Plot

Reception

Film edition

References

External links
 Kabuki theater's most animated show: One Piece, trailer at TOKYOPOP TV

Kabuki plays
One Piece mass media